Skippy is the nickname of the following people:

  Skippy Baxter (1919–2012), American figure skater
  Skippy Blair (born 1924), American dance instructor
  David Browning (1931–1956), American diver and 1952 Olympic champion
  Milt Byrnes (1916–1979), American Major League Baseball player
  Skippy Hamahona (born 1975), New Zealand former field hockey player
  Geoff Huegill (born 1979), Australian swimmer
  Scott "Skippy" Jessop (born 1977), American internet personality 
  Gregory Messam (born 1973), Jamaican football defender
  Pat Morley (footballer) (born 1965), Irish former footballer
  David Parsons (racing driver) (born 1959), Australian retired racing driver
  Pierre Poilievre (born 1979), Canadian politician
  Skippy Roberge (1917–1993), American Major League Baseball player
  William "Skippy" Rohan (1871–1916), American gangster
  Skippy Whitaker (1930–1990), American collegiate basketball player
  Skippy Williams (1916–1994), American jazz saxophonist
  Marc “Skippy” Levine (Born 1970), Renowned American Project Manager

See also 

 Skip (nickname)

Lists of people by nickname